Antero Lehto (born 2 April 1984) is a Finnish basketball player. 185 cm tall point guard Lehto plays for Pallacanestro Varese of the Lega Basket Serie A. Alongside Finnish competitions, Lehto has represented Pyrintö in EuroChallenge and Baltic Basketball League.

Lehto won Finnish championship with Tampereen Pyrintö in 2010, 2011 and 2014. Moreover, he has achieved Finnish cup championship in 2013, cup silver medal in 2009 and 2012 and Korisliiga bronze medal in 2009. Lehto was elected Korisliiga's Player of the Year in 2014, Defensive player of the Year in 2012 and Most developed player of the Year in 2004 and 2014. In 2014 he was elected first time in Finland's national team rink.

Trophies and awards
Korisliiga's Player of the Year in 2014
Korisliiga's Defensive player of the Year in 2012
Korisliiga's Most developed player of the Year in 2004 and 2014
Finnish championship in 2010, 2011 and 2014
bronze in 2009
Finnish Cup in 2013
Finnish Cup runner-up in 2009 and 2012
Baltic League: fourth in 2014

References

External links
Antero Lehto Finnish Basketball Association
Antero Lehto Eurobasket.com

1984 births
Living people
Finnish men's basketball players
Pallacanestro Varese players
Sportspeople from Tampere
Tampereen Pyrintö players
2014 FIBA Basketball World Cup players
Point guards